Arthur Eric Rowton Gill,  (22 February 1882 – 17 November 1940) was an English sculptor, letter cutter, typeface designer, and printmaker. Although the Oxford Dictionary of National Biography describes Gill as "the greatest artist-craftsman of the twentieth century: a letter-cutter and type designer of genius", he is also a figure of considerable controversy following revelations of his sexual abuse of two of his daughters.

Gill was born in Brighton and grew up in Chichester, where he attended the local college before moving to London. There he became an apprentice with a firm of ecclesiastical architects and took evening classes in stone masonry and calligraphy. Gill abandoned his architectural training and set up a business cutting memorial inscriptions for buildings and headstones. He also began designing chapter headings and title pages for books.

As a young man, Gill was a member of the Fabian Society, but later resigned. Initially identifying with the Arts and Crafts Movement, by 1907 he was lecturing and campaigning against the movement's perceived failings. He became a Roman Catholic in 1913 and remained so for the rest of his life. Gill established a succession of craft communities, each with a chapel at its centre and with an emphasis on manual labour as opposed to more modern industrial methods. The first of these communities was at Ditchling in Sussex, where Gill established the Guild of St Joseph and St Dominic for Catholic craftsmen. Many members of the Guild, including Gill, were also members of the Third Order of St. Dominic, a lay division of the Dominican Order. At Ditchling, Gill and his assistants created several notable war memorials including those at Chirk in north Wales and at Trumpington near Cambridge, along with numerous works on religious subjects.

In 1924, the Gill family left Ditchling and moved to an isolated, disused monastery at Capel-y-ffin in the Black Mountains of Wales. The isolation of Capel-y-ffin suited Gill's wish to distance himself from what he regarded as an increasingly secular and industrialised society, and his time there proved to be among the most productive of his artistic career. At Capel, Gill made the sculptures The Sleeping Christ (1925), Deposition (1925), and Mankind (1927). He created engravings for a series of books published by the Golden Cockerel Press considered among the finest of their kind, and it was at Capel that he designed the typefaces Perpetua, Gill Sans, and Solus. After four years at Capel, Gill and his family moved into a quadrangle of properties at Speen in Buckinghamshire. From there, in the last decade of his life, Gill became an architectural sculptor of some fame, creating large, high profile works for central London buildings, including both the headquarters of the BBC and the forerunner of London Underground. His mammoth frieze The Creation of Man was the British Government's gift to the new League of Nations building in Geneva. Despite failing health Gill was active as a sculptor until the last weeks of his life, leaving several works to be completed by his assistants after his death.

Gill was a prolific writer on religious and social matters, with some 300 printed works including books and pamphlets to his name. He frequently courted controversy with his opposition to industrialisation, modern commerce, and the use of machinery in both the home and the workplace. In the years preceding World War II, he embraced pacifism and left-wing causes.

Gill's religious beliefs did not limit his sexual activity, which included several extramarital affairs. His religious views and subject matter contrast with his deviant sexual behaviour, including, as described in his personal diaries, his sexual abuse of his daughters, an incestuous relationship with at least one of his sisters, and sexual experiments with his dog. Since these revelations became public in 1989, there have been a number of calls for works by Gill to be removed from public buildings and art collections.

Biography

Early life 
Eric Gill was born in 1882 in Hamilton Road, Brighton, the second of the 13 children of the Reverend Arthur Tidman Gill and (Cicely) Rose King (died 1929), formerly a professional singer of light opera under the name Rose le Roi. Arthur Tidman Gill had left the Congregational church in 1878 over doctrinal disagreements and became a minister of a sect of Calvinist Methodists known as the Countess of Huntingdon's Connexion. Arthur was born in the South Seas, where his father, George Gill, was a Congregational minister and missionary. Eric Gill was the elder brother of the graphic artist MacDonald "Max" Gill (1884–1947). Two of his other brothers, Romney and Cecil, became Anglican missionaries while their sister, Madeline, became a nun and also undertook missionary work.

In 1897, the family moved to Chichester, when Arthur Tidman Gill left the Countess of Huntingdon's Connexion, became a mature student at Chichester Theological College and joined the Church of England. Eric Gill studied at Chichester Technical and Art School, where he won a Queen's Prize for perspective drawing and developed a passion for lettering. Later in his life, Gill cited the Norman and medieval carved stone panels in Chichester Cathedral as a major influence on his sculpture. In 1900 Gill became disillusioned with Chichester and moved to London to train as an architect with the practice of W. D. Caröe, specialists in ecclesiastical architecture with a large office close to Westminster Abbey.

London 1900–1907 
Frustrated with his architectural training, Gill took evening classes in stonemasonry at the Westminster Technical Institute and, from 1901, in calligraphy at the Central School of Arts and Crafts while continuing to work at Caröe's. The calligraphy course was run by Edward Johnston, creator of the London Underground typeface, who became a strong and lasting influence on Gill. For a year, until 1903, Gill and Johnston shared lodgings at Lincoln's Inn in central London. 

During 1903, Gill gave up training in architecture to become a calligrapher, letter-cutter and monumental mason. After making a copy of a small stone tablet from Westminster Abbey, Gill's first public inscription was for a stone memorial tablet, to a Percy Joseph Hiscock, in Chichester Cathedral. Through a contact at the Central School, Gill was employed to cut the inscription for a tombstone at Brookwood Cemetery in Surrey. Other work quickly followed, including an inscription for Holy Trinity, Sloane Street, plus commissions from architects and private individuals, including Count Kessler. Kessler, on Johnston's recommendation, employed Gill to design chapter headings and title pages for the Insel Verlag publishling house. W.H. Smith & Son employed Gill to paint the lettering on the fascias of several of their bookshops including, in 1903, their Paris store. For a time, Gill combined this work with his job at Caröe's but eventually the scale and frequency of these commissions required him to leave the company. After Gill died, his brother, Evan, compiled an inventory of 762 inscriptions known to have been carved by him.

In 1904 Gill married Ethel Hester Moore (1878–1961), a former art student, later known as Mary, the daughter of a businessman who was also the head verger at Chichester Cathedral. Gill and Moore would eventually have three daughters and foster a son. After a short period in Battersea, the couple moved into 20 Black Lion Lane, Hammersmith in west London, near the, recently married, Johnstons' home on Hammersmith Terrace. A number of artists associated with the Arts and Crafts movement, including Emery Walker, T. J. Cobden-Sanderson and May Morris were already based in the area, as were a number of printing presses, notably the Doves Press. Gill formed a business partnership with Lawrence Christie and recruited a number of staff, including the 14-year old Joseph Cribb, to work in his studio. Gill began giving lectures at the Central School and taught courses in monumental masonry and lettering for stonemasons at the Paddington Institute. In 1905 he was elected to the Arts and Crafts Exhibition Society and joined the Fabian Society the following year. After a period of intense involvement with the Fabians, Gill became disillusioned with both them and the Arts and Craft movement. By 1907 he was writing and making speeches about the failures, both theoretical and practical, of the craft movement to resist the advance of mass-production.

In his diaries, Gill records two affairs while living at Hammersmith. He had a brief affair with the family maid while his wife was pregnant and then a relationship with Lillian Meacham, who he met through the Fabian Society. Gill and Meacham visited the Paris Opera and Chartres Cathedral together and when their affair ended, she became an apprentice in Gill's workshop and remained a family friend throughout her life.

Ditchling Village 1907–1913 
In 1907, Gill moved with his family to Sopers, a house in the village of Ditchling in Sussex, which would later become the centre of an artists' community inspired by Gill. Although by April 1908 Gill had established a workshop in Ditchling and dissolved his business partnership with Lawrence Christie, he continued to spend considerable amounts of time in London visiting clients and delivering lectures, while his wife Ethel organised their household and smallholding in Sussex. In London, Gill would stay at his old lodgings in Lincoln's Inn with his brother Max or with his sister Gladys and Ernest Laughton, her future husband. Gill continued to concentrate on lettering and inscriptions for stonework and employed a pupil for his signwriting business. He also began to use wood engraving techniques for his book illustration work, notably for a 1907 edition of Homer for Count Kessler.

Late in 1909 Gill decided to become a sculptor. Gill had always considered himself an artisan craftsman rather than an artist. He rejected the usual sculpture technique of first making a model and then scaling up using a pointing machine, in favour of directly carving the final figure. His first sculptures included Madonna and Child (1910), which the art critic Roger Fry described as a depiction of "pathetic animalism", and the almost life-size work now known as Ecstasy (1911). The models for Ecstasy were his sister Gladys Gill and her husband Ernest Laughton. The incestuous relationships between Gill and Gladys that continued during their lives had already begun at this point. There is also some evidence, from Gill's own writings, of an incestuous relationship with Angela, another of his sisters.

An early admirer of Gill's sculptures was William Rothenstein and he introduced Gill, who was fascinated by Indian temple sculptures, to the Ceylonese philosopher and art historian Ananda Coomaraswamy. Along with his friend and collaborator Jacob Epstein, Gill planned the construction in the Sussex countryside of a colossal, hand-carved monument in imitation of the large-scale structures at Gwalior Fort in Madhya Pradesh. Throughout the second half of 1910, Epstein and Gill would meet on an almost daily basis, but eventually their friendship soured very badly. Earlier in the year they had held long discussions with Rothenstein and other artists, including Augustus John and Ambrose McEvoy, about the formation of a religious brotherhood. At Ditchling, Epstein worked on elements of Oscar Wilde's tomb in Père Lachaise cemetery for which Gill designed the inscription before sending Joseph Cribb, who had moved to Ditchling in 1907, to Paris to carve the lettering.

Gill had his first sculpture exhibition in 1911 at the Chenil Gallery in London. Eight works by Gill were included in the Second Post-Impressionism Exhibition organised by Roger Fry at the Grafton Galleries in London during 1912 and 1913.

By 1912, while Gill's main source of income was from gravestone inscriptions, he had also carved a number of Madonna figures and was widely assumed, wrongly at that time, to be a Catholic artist. As such he was invited to an exhibition of Catholic art in Brussels and, on route, stayed for some days at the Benedictine monastery at Mont-César Abbey near Louvain. Gill's experiences at Louvain, seeing the monks at prayer and hearing plainsong for the first time convinced him to become a Roman Catholic. In February 1913, after religious instructions from English Benedictines, Gill and Ethel were received into the Catholic Church and Ethel changed her name to Mary.

Westminster Cathedral 1914–1918

In 1913, after Gill and his wife became Roman Catholics they moved to Hopkin's Crank at Ditchling Common, two miles north of Ditchling village. There, Gill worked primarily for Catholic clients, notably his 1914 commission for the 14 stations of the cross in Westminster Cathedral. Gill was a surprising choice for the commission as he had only recently become a Catholic and had only been a sculptor for three years. However he was prepared to do the work quicker and for a lower fee than more established sculptors would. Gill modelled both the Christ figure in panel ten and a soldier in the second panel on himself. The Stations were not universally well received when they were erected with criticism of their simple appearance and how starkly they contrasted with the rest of the cathedral interior. A minority, that eventually included Nikolaus Pevsner, praised their uncluttered design and unsentimental treatment of the subject. They are now considered among Gill's most accomplished large scale works. Subsequently, Gill submitted proposals for decorations and works in other parts of the Cathedral building and, eventually, his design for the Chapel of Saint George and the English Martyrs was commissioned.

Gill had been granted exemption from military service while working on the Stations of the Cross and when they were finished spent three months, from September 1918, as a driver at an RAF camp in Dorset, before returning to Ditchling.

Ditchling Common 1918–1924 
After World War I, together with Hilary Pepler and Desmond Chute, Gill founded a guild association to promote the ideals of medieval, or pre-industrial, craft production, the Guild of St Joseph and St Dominic at Ditchling. The Guild's emphasis was on manual labour as opposed to more modern industrial methods, such that they did not use mechanised tools and considered craft working a form of holy worship. All members of the Guild were Catholics and most, including Gill, were also members of the Third Order of St. Dominic, a lay division of the Dominican Order. Lay members were not expected to follow the Dominicans daily Liturgy of the Hours, a schedule of prayers from the Angelus at 6am to Compline at 9pm, but the group at Ditchling, unusually, did so. A chapel, designed by Gill, was built in the centre of the Guild's workshops and a wooden cross, with a Christ figure carved by Gill, was erected on a nearby hill. Gill had also taken to wearing a habit, often with a symbolic cord of chastity added. In his family home, Gill determined that the household was to be free of modern appliances, with no bathroom, water drawn by a pump and cooking done on a log fire. One guest who brought a typewriter into the house was scolded for doing so. The children did not attend school.

Alongside the Guild, Pepler set up the St Dominic's Press with a 100-year old Stanhope press that he bought. The Press printed books and pamphlets promoting the ideals of the Guilds' traditional craft techniques and also provided an outlet for Gill's engravings and woodcut illustrations. Gill and Pepler together produced issues of The Game, a small journal, mostly illustrated by Gill and containing articles on craft and social matters. The views promoted by Gill and Pepler in The Game and their other publications were often deliberately provocative, anti-capitalist and opposed to industrialisation.

Along with his Guild work and illustrations, Gill designed several war memorials in this period. These included the Trumpington War Memorial in Cambridgeshire, the Chirk War Memorial in north Wales, the memorial at Ditchling, and the wall panel recording 228 names of the fallen in the ante-chapel at New College, Oxford. Gill also created the memorial at Briantspuddle in Dorset and, with Chute and Hilary Stratton, the monument at South Harting. Beside the main entrance to the British Museum, Gill designed and carved, with Joseph Cribb, the memorial inscription to the museum staff killed in the conflict and for the Victoria and Albert Museum, again with Cribb, he created the war memorial in that museum's entrance hall. Previously, in 1911, Gill had cut the inscription for the foundation stone of the British Museum's new King Edward VII building. Gill's other significant work from this period was the Stations of the Cross that he carved, with Chute, for the Church of St Cuthbert in the Manningham area of Bradford.

Commissioned to produce a war memorial for the University of Leeds, Gill produced a frieze depicting the Cleansing of the Temple but showing contemporary merchants as the money-changers Jesus was driving from the Temple. While fully aware that this was an inappropriate subject for a war memorial and one likely to cause great offence in a commercial centre such as Leeds, Gill persisted with the design regardless. The cartoon-like nature of the finished frieze, which included the Hound of St Dominic knocking over a cash till, only added to the ferocity of the resulting uproar.

Even before the Leeds memorial controversy, Gill's series of illustrations that included the Nuptials of God, The Convert and Divine Lovers and his views on the sexual nature of Christianity were causing alarm within the Roman Catholic hierarchy and distancing Gill from other members of the Ditchling community. The series of life-drawings and prints of his daughters, including Girl in Bath and Hair Combing done at Ditchling, were considered among Gill's finest works. The sexual abuse Gill was perpetrating on his two eldest daughters during the same period only became known after his death.

A number of professional craft workers joined the community, such that by the early 1920s the community had grown to 41 people, occupying several houses in the 20 acres surrounding the Guild's chapel and workshops. Notable visitors to the Common included G. K. Chesterton and Hilaire Belloc, whose Distributist ideas the Guild followed. Some young men who had been in combat in World War I came to stay for longer periods. These included Denis Tegetmeier, Reginald Lawson and the artist and poet David Jones, who was to become engaged for a time to Gill's second daughter, Petra. 
 
However, Gill became disillusioned with the direction of the Guild and fell out badly with his close friend Pepler, partly over the latter's wish to expand the community and form closer ties with Ditchling village and also because Gill's daughter, Betty, wanted to marry Pepler's son, David. Gill resigned from the Guild in July 1924 and, after considering a number of other locations in Britain and Ireland, moved his family to a deserted monastery in the Black Mountains of Wales.

Capel-y-ffin 1924–1928 

In August 1924, the Gills left Ditchling and, with two other families, moved to a disused monastery, Llanthony Abbey, at Capel-y-ffin in the Black Mountains of Wales. The dilapidated building was high in an isolated valley about fourteen miles from Abergavenny. Finding the monastery chapel beyond repair, a new one was quickly built and a Benedictine monk from Caldey Abbey was assigned to the group to hold a daily Mass. Donald Attwater arrived at Capel-y-ffin shortly before the Gills, David Jones and René Hague, Joan Gill's future husband, all joined shortly after. Joseph Cribb did not make the move to Wales but his younger brother, Lawrence Cribb (1898–1979), did and eventually became Gill's main assistant.

Within a few weeks of arriving at Capel-y-ffin, Gill completed Deposition, a black marble torso of Christ, and made The Sleeping Christ, a stone head now in Manchester City Art Gallery. In 1926 he completed a sculpture of Tobias and Sara for the library of St John's College, Oxford. A war memorial altarpiece in oak relief for Rossall School was completed in 1927.

When approached, in 1924, by Robert Gibbings to produce designs for the Golden Cockerel Press which he and his wife, Moira, had recently acquired, Gill initially refused to work with the couple as they were not Catholics. Gill changed his mind when they sought to publish a volume of poems by his sister Enid. The relationship between Gill and the Gibbingses grew such that throughout the following ten years Gill became the chief engraver and illustrator for the Golden Cockerel Press. Several of the resulting books, including The Song of Songs (1925), Troilus and Criseyde (1927), The Canterbury Tales (1928), and The Four Gospels (1931) are considered classics of specialist book production. Gill created striking designs that unified and integrated illustrations into the text and also created a new typeface for the Press. The erotic nature of The Song of Songs and of the illustrations for Edward Powys Mathers's Procreant Hymn caused considerable controversy in Roman Catholic circles and led to protracted arguments between Gill and members of the clergy. The Golden Cockerel printed four of Gill's own books and he illustrated a further thirteen works for the press. In addition, between 1924 and his death, Gill wrote 38 books and illustrated a further 28. 
 
The other key working relationship Gill established while at Capel-y-ffin was with Stanley Morison, the Typographic Advisor to the Monotype Corporation. Morison persuaded Gill to apply the skills and knowledge he had gained in letter cutting to fonts suitable for mechanical reproduction. It was at Capel that Gill designed the typefaces Perpetua (1925), Gill Sans (1927 onwards) and began work on Solus (1929). Gill Sans is considered one of the most successful type-faces ever designed and remains in wide spread use.

While living at Capel-y-ffin, Gill spent many weekends at Robert and Moira Gibbings home in Waltham St Lawrence, enjoying the couple's unconventional and hedonistic lifestyle. He was also spending sizable amounts of time in Bristol with a group of young intellectuals centred around Douglas Cleverdon, a bookseller who published and distributed some of Gill's writings. From 1925 onwards, Gills' secretary, and mistress, was Elizabeth Bill. Bill owned a villa set in several acres in the French Pyrenees at Salies-de-Béarn and which the Gills often visited. The Gill family spent the winter of 1926–27 there, and which was where Gill did many of the engravings for Troilus and Criseyde. For the last months of 1927 he worked in a studio in London at Glebe Place in Chelsea creating the sculpture originally known as Humanity and now called Mankind. The work, a giant torso, was modelled by Angela Gill and shown at the Goupil Gallery in London, to considerable acclaim, before being purchased by the artist Eric Kennington. Some years later, Kennington offered the work to Whipsnade Zoo. The zoo refused the offer, and the work is now in the Tate collection but displayed at the Victoria and Albert Museum.

It had been too impractical to transport the stone for Mankind to Capel-y-ffin and it was clear that the site had become too remote and isolated for Gill's increasing commercial workload and by May 1928 he was seeking a new home for his family and workshops.

Pigotts, Buckinghamshire 1928–1934
In October 1928, the Gill family moved to Pigotts at Speen, five miles from High Wycombe in Buckinghamshire. Around a quadrangle with a central pigsty were a large farmhouse housing Eric and Mary Gill, a cottage for Petra and her husband Denis Tegetmeier and another for Joanna and René Hague. Stables and barns were converted to studios and workshops and to house printing presses. A chapel was fitted into one corner and licensed within six months for the saying of Mass.

The success of his 1928 exhibition at the Goupil Gallery had raised Gill's profile considerably and led to Charles Holden commissioning him to lead a team of five sculptors, including Henry Moore, in creating some of the external sculptures for the new headquarters building of the London Electric Railway, the forerunner of London Underground. Gill started on the project within days of arriving at Pigotts and worked on site in London from November 1928 to carve three of eight relief sculptures on the theme of The Four Winds for the building.

Art-Nonsense And Other Essays by Eric Gill was published in 1929 and marked the first commercial use of the Perpetua typeface. The frontispiece of the book had an engraving of Belle Sauvage, an image of a naked women stepping out of some woods. The various versions of Belle Sauvage became among the most popular of Gill's illustrations and were modelled by Beatrice Warde, a historian of typography, an executive of the Monotype Corporation and sometimes Gill's lover. By 1930 Gladys Gill had divorced her second husband after her first, Ernest Laughton, had being killed in the Battle of the Somme, and she and Eric appear, from his diary entries, to have resumed their incestuous relationship. Later that same year the diaries record what Gill called his 'experiments' with a dog. In September 1930 he was taken seriously ill with a variety of symptoms, including amnesia, and spent several weeks in hospital. 

The following two years were among the most creatively accomplished of Gill's career, with several notable achievements. The Hague and Gill press was established at Pigotts in 1931 and eventually printed 16 of Gill's own books and booklets while he also illustrated six other books for the company. For the Hague and Gill press he created the Joanna typeface, which was eventually adapted for commercial use by Monotype. He completed The Four Gospels, widely considered to be the finest of all the books produced by the Golden Cockerel Press, and began working on the sculpture Prospero and Ariel for the BBC's Broadcasting House in London. Throughout 1931 and into 1932, Gill worked on Prospero and Ariel, and four other works for the BBC, on site in central London. Carving in the open air up on scaffolding in the middle of London further increased Gill's public profile. Although Gill had accepted the BBC's choice of subject matter when he took the commission he didn't see its relevance and frequently claimed that the figures he created represented God the Father and God the Son, the latter complete with the marks of the stigmata.

The Midland Hotel, Morecambe was built in 1932–33 by the London Midland & Scottish Railway to the Art Deco design of Oliver Hill and included several works by Gill, Marion Dorn, and Eric Ravilious. For the project Gill, with Lawrence Cribb and Donald Potter, produced two seahorses, modelled as Morecambe shrimps, for the outside entrance; a round plaster relief on the ceiling of the circular staircase inside the hotel; a decorative wall map of the north-west of England; and a large stone relief of Odysseus being welcomed from the sea by Nausicaa for the entrance lounge. While working in Morecambe, Gill met May Reeves, who became a regular visitor to Pigotts before moving there to run a small school and becoming Gill's resident mistress for several years.

Jerusalem and Pigotts, 1934–1938

In 1934 Gill, with Lawrence Cribb, visited Jerusalem to work at the Palestine Archaeological Museum, now the Rockefeller Archaeological Museum. There they carved a stone bas-relief of the meeting of Asia and Africa above the front entrance, together with ten stone reliefs illustrating different cultures, and a gargoyle fountain in the inner courtyard. He also carved stone signage throughout the museum in English, Hebrew and Arabic.

Gill's two visits to Jerusalem had a profound impact on his state of mind. He became increasingly unhappy with the impact of humanity upon the world and also become convinced of his own role as one chosen by God to change society. Returning to England, Gill's mood of pessimism deepened with the death of his son-in-law, David Pepler, and he became increasingly antagonistic towards the Church and towards other artists. Paradoxically, alongside this despondent world view Gill dropped his long-standing opposition to the use of modern home comforts and appliances. A bathroom was installed at Pigotts, a chauffeur and a gardener were appointed and his secretaries were allowed to use typewriters. Religious observance was no longer expected of the workshop staff and among the additional apprentices and assistants Gill employed were a number of non-Catholics, including Walter Ritchie. Prudence Pelham, the daughter of the Earl of Chichester, became Gill's only female apprentice. During his career, Gill employed at least twenty-seven apprentices including his nephew John Skelton, Hilary Stratton, Desmond Chute, David Kindersley and Donald Potter.

Gill's 1935 essay All Art is Propaganda marked a complete reversal of his previous belief that artists should not concern themselves with political activity. He became a supporter of social credit and later moved towards a socialist position. In 1934, Gill contributed art to an exhibition mounted by the left-wing Artists' International Association, and defended the exhibition against accusations in The Catholic Herald that its art was "anti-Christian". Gill became a regular speaker at left-wing meetings and rallies throughout the second half of the 1930s. He was adamantly opposed to fascism, and was one of the few Catholics in Britain to openly support the Spanish Republicans. Gill became a pacifist and helped set up the Catholic peace organisation Pax with E. I. Watkin and Donald Attwater. Later, Gill joined the Peace Pledge Union and supported the British branch of the Fellowship of Reconciliation.

Gill was commissioned to produce a sequence of seven bas-relief panels for the façade of The People's Palace, now the Great Hall of Queen Mary University of London, which opened in 1936. In 1937, he designed the background of the first George VI definitive stamp series for the post office. In 1938 Gill was commissioned to create a mammoth artwork for the Palace of Nations building in Geneva, as the British Government's gift to the League of Nations. Gill's original proposal was to create a larger, international, version of the Moneychangers frieze that had caused such outrage in Leeds years earlier, but after objections from delegates to the League, submitted an alternative scheme. The Creation of Man flanked by Man's Gifts to God and God's Gifts to Man are three marble bas-reliefs in seventeen sections and constitute the largest single work Gill created during his career but are not considered among his finest works.

In 1935, Gill was elected an Honorary Associate of the Institute of British Architects and in 1937 was made a Royal Designer for Industry, the highest British award for designers, by the Royal Society of Arts, and became a founder-member of the RSA's Faculty of Royal Designers for Industry when it was established in 1938. In April 1937, Gill was elected an associate member of the Royal Academy. Quite why Gill was offered, let alone accepted, these honours from institutions he had openly reviled throughout his career is unclear.

Final works, 1939–1940

During 1938 and 1939 Gill designed his only complete piece of architecture, the Roman Catholic Church of St Peter the Apostle at Gorleston-on-Sea. He designed the building around a central altar which, at the time, was considered a radical departure from the Catholic practice of the altar being at the east end of a church.

Gill's final publications included Twenty-Five Nudes and Drawings from Life both of which included drawings of Daisy Hawkins, the teenage daughter of the Gills' housekeeper who Gill began an affair with in 1937. The affair lasted two years during which time Gill drew her on an almost daily basis. When Hawkins was sent away from Pigotts, to the boarding house at Capel-y-ffin run by Betty Gill, Eric Gill followed her there to continue the relationship.

Among Gill's last sculptures were a series of commissions for Guildford Cathedral. He spent time between October and December 1939 working at Guildford, on scaffolding carving the figure of St. John the Baptist. He also worked on a set of panels depicting the stations of the cross for the Anglican St Alban's Church in Oxford, finishing the drawings three weeks before he died and completing nine of the pieces himself. For the Chapel of Saint George and the English Martyrs, in Westminster Cathedral, Gill designed a low relief sculpture to occupy the wall behind the altar. Gill's design showed a life-sized figure of Christ the Priest on the cross attended by Sir Thomas More and John Fisher. Gill died before the work was completed and Lawrence Cribb was tasked with finishing the piece by the Cathedral authorities who insisted he remove an element of Gill's original design, a figure of a pet monkey. When the chapel was eventually opened to the public this censorship of Gills' last work was a matter of some considerable controversy.

From the end of 1939 into the middle of 1940, Gill had a series of illnesses, including rubella, but managed to write his autobiography that summer. Gill died of lung cancer in Harefield Hospital in Middlesex on the morning of Sunday 17 November 1940 and, after a funeral mass at the Pigotts chapel, was buried in Speen's Baptist churchyard.

After Gill died an inventory of over 750 of his carved inscriptions was compiled, in addition to the over 100 stone sculptures and reliefs, 1000 engravings, the several typeface designs he created and his 300 printed works including books, articles and pamphlets.

Sexual abuse 
Gill's personal diaries reveal his child sex abuse of his two eldest teenage daughters during their time at Ditchling Common, incestuous relationships with his sisters, and, in 1930, sexual acts on his dog. This aspect of Gill's life was little known beyond his family and friends until the publication of the 1989 biography by Fiona MacCarthy. A 1966 biography by Robert Speaight mentioned none of it. Gill's daughter Petra Tegetmeier, who was alive at the time of the MacCarthy biography, described her father as having "endless curiosity about sex" and that "we just took it for granted", and told her friend Patrick Nuttgens she was unembarrassed. The children were educated at home and, according to Tegetmeier, she was then unaware of how her father's behaviour would seem to others. Despite the acclaim the book received, and the widespread revulsion towards aspects of Gill's sexual life that followed publication, MacCarthy received some criticism for revealing Gill's incest in his daughter's lifetime. Others, notably Bernard Levin, thought she had been too indulgent towards Gill. MacCarthy commented: 
after the initial shock, [...] as Gill's history of adulteries, incest, and experimental connection with his dog became public knowledge in the late 1980s, the consequent reassessment of his life and art left his artistic reputation strengthened. Gill emerged as one of the twentieth century's strangest and most original controversialists, a sometimes infuriating, always arresting spokesman for man's continuing need of God in an increasingly materialistic civilization, and for intellectual vigour in an age of encroaching triviality.

Despite MacCarthy's revelations, for several years Gill's reputation as an artist continued to grow but, following the exposure of other high-profile paedophiles, this changed with groups and individuals calling for the removal of works by Gill.

In 1998, a group, Ministers and Clergy Sexual Abuse Survivors, called for the Gill's Stations of the Cross to be removed from Westminster Cathedral, leading to a debate within the British Catholic press. There were calls for Gill's statue of St Michael the Archangel to be removed from St Patrick's Catholic Church in Dumbarton. In 2016, some residents in Ditchling objected to a proposal to erect a plaque by the village war memorial which would have identified Gill as the maker of the monument.
In January 2022, a man climbed the façade of Broadcasting House and damaged the statue of Prospero and Ariel with a hammer, while another man shouted about Gill's paedophilia. Nearly 2,500 people had previously signed a petition, on the website 38 Degrees, asking for the work to be removed. Guildford Cathedral announced in February 2022 that it was considering a 'new interpretation' concerning Gill's statues of Saint John the Baptist and of Christ on the Cross which are on their building. Several organisations, including Save the Children, resolved to stop using typefaces designed by Gill.

When, in 2017, the journalist Rachel Cooke contacted museums holding Gill's work to question what, if any, impact the abuse revelations had on their policy towards showing material by him, the majority refused to engage with her. A notable exception was the Ditchling Museum of Art + Craft, which holds many examples of Gill's work and also Gill family objects. Previously, in October 2016, the museum had held a workshop, Not Turning a Blind Eye, with artists, curators and journalists invited to discuss how to address Gill's behaviour in its exhibition programme. This resulted in a 2017 exhibition Eric Gill: The Body and a commitment by the museum to include at least one display highlighting Gill's offending in its permanent exhibitions. However in 2022, The Observer reported that it appeared that the museum had decided to reduce the prominence given to Gill's work among its exhibits.

Typefaces and inscriptions 
In 1909, Gill carved Alphabets and Numerals for a book, "Manuscript and Inscription Letters for Schools and Classes and for the Use of Craftsmen", compiled by Edward Johnston. He later gave them to the Victoria and Albert Museum so they could be used by students at the Royal College of Art. In 1914, Gill had met the typographer Stanley Morison, who was later to become a typographic consultant for the Monotype Corporation. Commissioned by Morison, he designed the Gill Sans typeface in 1927–30. Gill Sans was based on the sans-serif lettering originally designed for the London Underground. Gill had collaborated with Edward Johnston in the early design of the Underground typeface, but dropped out of the project before it was completed. In 1925, he designed the Perpetua typeface for Morison, with the uppercase based upon monumental Roman inscriptions. An in-situ example of Gill's design and personal cutting in the style of Perpetua can be found in the nave of the church in Poling, West Sussex, on a wall plaque commemorating the life of Sir Harry Johnston. In the period 1930–31, Gill designed the typeface Joanna which he used to hand-set his book, An Essay on Typography.

Gill's other types include:
 Golden Cockerel Press Type (for the Golden Cockerel Press; 1929) Designed bolder than some of Gill's other typefaces to provide a complement to wood engravings.
 Solus (1929)
 Aries (1932)
 Floriated Capitals (1932)
 Bunyan (1934)
 Pilgrim (recut version of Bunyan; 1953)
 Jubilee (also known as Cunard; 1934)

These dates are not precise, since a lengthy period could pass between Gill creating a design and it being finalised by the Monotype drawing office team (who would work out many details such as spacing) and cut into metal. In addition, some designs such as Joanna were released to fine printing use long before they became widely available from Monotype.

One of the most widely used British typefaces, Gill Sans, was used in the classic design system of Penguin Books and by the London and North Eastern Railway and later British Railways, with many additional styles created by Monotype both during and after Gill's lifetime. In the 1990s, the BBC adopted Gill Sans for its wordmark and many of its on-screen television graphics.

The family Gill Facia was created by Colin Banks as an emulation of Gill's stone carving designs, with separate styles for smaller and larger text.

Gill was commissioned to develop a typeface with the number of allographs limited to what could be used on Monotype systems or Linotype machines. The typeface was loosely based on the Arabic Naskh style but was considered unacceptably far from the norms of Arabic script. It was rejected and never cut into type.

Published works 

Gill published numerous essays on the relationship between art and religion, and a number of erotic engravings.

Gill's published writings include:
 Christianity and Art, 1927
 Art-nonsense and other essays, Cassell 1929 (pocket edition 1934)
 Clothes: An Essay Upon the Nature and Significance of the Natural and Artificial Integuments Worn by Men and Women, 1931
 An Essay on Typography, 1931
 Beauty Looks After Herself, 1933
 Unemployment, 1933
 Money and Morals, 1934
 Art and a Changing Civilization, 1934
 Work and Leisure, 1935
 The Necessity of Belief, 1935
 Work and Property, 1937
 Work and Culture, Journal of the Royal Society of Arts, 1938
 Twenty-five nudes, 1938
 And Who Wants Peace?, 1938
 Sacred and Secular, 1940
 Autobiography: Quod Ore Sumpsimus
 Notes on Postage Stamps
 Christianity and the Machine Age, 1940.
 On the Birmingham School of Art, 1940
 Last Essays, 1943
 A Holy Tradition of Working: passages from the writings of Eric Gill 1983.

Gill provided woodcuts and illustrations for several books including:
 
  Facsimile edition published by Christopher Skelton at the September Press, Wellingborough, 1987.
 
 
 The Passion of Our Lord Jesus Christ, according to the four evangelists. Hague & Gill Printers. 1934 Faber & Faber

Archive 
Gill's papers and library are archived at the William Andrews Clark Memorial Library at UCLA in California, designated by the Gill family as the repository for his manuscripts and correspondence. Some of the books in his collection have been digitised as part of the Internet Archive. Additional archival and book collections related to Gill and his work reside at the University of Waterloo Library and the University of Notre Dame's Hesburgh Library. Much of Gill's work and memorabilia is held and is on display at the Ditchling Museum of Art + Craft.

References

Further reading

External links 

 
 Biography of Gill on website of The Guild of St Joseph and St Dominic, with commentary on his 'unorthodox' interpretation of Catholicism
 Manuscript & Inscription Letters, Edward Johnston, 1909 (plates by Gill)
 Portraits of Gill in the National Portrait Gallery, London
 Portraits by Gill in the National Portrait Gallery, London
 Prints and drawings by Gill in the British Museum collection
 Twenty-five Nudes, Gill, 1938 (collected drawings)
 Troilus and Criseyde, Geoffrey Chaucer, translated by George Philip Knapp, 1932
 Works by Gill in the National Museum Wales collection (woodcuts by Gill)

1882 births
1940 deaths
20th-century British printmakers
20th-century British sculptors
Academics of the Central School of Art and Design
Alumni of the Central School of Art and Design
Alumni of the Westminster School of Art
Artists from Brighton
Arts and Crafts movement
Associates of the Royal Academy
British architectural sculptors
British erotic artists
British letter cutters
British stamp designers
Burials in Berkshire
Child sexual abuse in England
Converts to Roman Catholicism
Deaths from lung cancer in England
English anti-fascists
English graphic designers
English illustrators
English male sculptors
English pacifists
English rapists
English Roman Catholics
English sex offenders
English socialists
English typographers and type designers
English wood engravers
Incest
Monumental masons
People from Ditchling
Stone carvers
Zoophilia
20th-century engravers